Michael James Whale (born 13 May 1951) is an English radio personality, television presenter, podcast host and author. He gained initial prominence in the 1980s as the host of The James Whale Radio Show on Radio Aire in Leeds, which was simulcast on national television. From 1995 to 2008, Whale hosted a night time radio show on talkSPORT (Talk Radio 1995–2000), followed by stints on LBC 97.3 and various BBC radio stations.

Whale is the current host of his podcast The James Whale Show and a night time radio show on talkRADIO and TalkTV.

Early life
Whale was born on 13 May 1951 in Ewell, Surrey into "an ordinary middle class family". His English father David worked in the family business S&R Whale, which made dresses, aprons and overalls in a factory in Brixton, London. His Welsh mother Anne (née Price) was a professional ballet dancer. His parents later owned The Green Man pub in Ewell. Whale has a younger brother, Keith. Whale did not enjoy his school life. After failing his eleven-plus exam, he attended Linton's Lane Secondary Modern School and Longmead County Secondary Boys School, both in Epsom.

From fourteen to sixteen, Whale took up archery and became a Surrey junior champion. He relocated to the King's Cross area of London where his parents ran a pub. He wanted to become an actor, but his mother advised him to "get a proper job". Among Whale's first jobs was as a trainee buyer for Harrods. In this job he came into contact with a DJ who influenced him to become one soon after, citing Tony Blackburn, Johnnie Walker and Kid Jensen as among his favourites. After learning that Watneys was to open a chain of discos, Whale took their DJ training course and landed his first gig at The Bird's Nest in Muswell Hill, north London. He found the experience "dull", but realised he had an ability to introduce records and worked at a Watney's venue in Sweden for several months. Upon returning home Whale resumed DJ work, took acting lessons and worked as a rep, but earned little money.

Career

1970–1995: Early career and ITV television show
Whale began his broadcasting career in 1970 following a visit to a Topshop store on Regent Street, London. He spoke to manager Ralph Halpern who initially declined to hire a DJ for the store, after which he worked as an assistant stage manager at a theatre in Oxford. Whale was soon invited back to Topshop and accepted work as one of the launch DJs of Radio Topshop, the in-house radio station. In 1974, he became the host of an evening talk radio show at Metro Radio, serving northeast England from studios in Swalwell, Gateshead. He was the first presenter of the very successful and much talked about Nightowls program, which he continued hosting into the early '80's.  During this time, Whale took up additional work as an actor, playing roles in Z-Cars. He later moved to BBC Radio Derby to host a morning phone-in, working with Terry Christian who later became a colleague at talkSPORT.

In 1982, Whale joined Radio Aire in Leeds to host the late night talk show; by 1986 he moved to the Breakfast Show, before returning to the late show in early 1987. He released two singles in 1987: "The Whaley Rap" / "I Hear James (On the Radio)" and "Wrap it Up for Xmas".

In the late 1980s, Whale became influenced by American radio hosts, including "shock jock" Howard Stern, and changed his style, having become tired of the "lovely phone-ins" that he had been accustomed to. Commencing on the "Friday night" of 24 September 1988 - the 1am start time making it technically a Saturday morning - Whale's radio show at Radio Aire was simulcast with Yorkshire Television and was titled The James Whale Radio Show, featuring live studio guests, music and listener phone calls. The show became a ratings success, and in less than seven months it started to air nationally on ITV. Conservative MP Jerry Hayes had a regular slot on the show and Steve Coogan would also make a regular appearance. By September 1989, the show attracted over one million viewers. It cost the television station £15,000 to run each hour.

In January 1993, Whale began a new ITV series, Whale On and in 1994 he presented a weekend afternoon show on LBC in London. He also presented The Blue Whale on Men and Motors.

1995–2008: Talk Radio/talkSPORT
In May 2008, Whale was sacked because he twice called on listeners to vote for Boris Johnson before the London mayoral election in 2008.

2008–2013: LBC
On 7 May 2008 Whale said he would join Bid TV. He continued to broadcast on JamesWhaleRadio.co.uk. On 20 May 2008, Whale began a four-hour weekly evening phone-in on Internet radio station Play Radio UK, however, on 2 September 2008 he said on air he was leaving Play Radio for book promotion and TV work. He said he would continue his blog.

After standing in for Clive Bull on LBC 97.3 for six days in August 2008, Whale covered for Nick Abbot for two weeks from 29 September 2008 on LBC. In November the same year, he began presenting the drivetime show on LBC between 4pm and 7pm every weekday.

2013–2016: Various projects
After leaving LBC 97.3 Whale presented shows at BBC Radio Berkshire, BBC Three Counties Radio, BBC WM, occasionally BBC Radio Kent and a new online format of his hit 1989 TV show, Whales Weekly.

In September 2013, Whale launched his weekly podcast, The James Whale Radio Show, which is produced by Rob Oldfield. The podcast has since run for over 300 original episodes.

On 13 December 2013, Whale announced that he would be the new permanent presenter of the BBC Essex breakfast programme. He presented his last show on the station on 23 September 2016.

On 28 July 2016, Whale entered the Celebrity Big Brother house to compete as a housemate in its eighteenth series. He was the sixth to be evicted, coming ninth overall.

2016–present: talkRADIO

Whale began covering shows on talkRADIO in October 2016 and he started presenting the Monday to Thursday evening show between 7pm and 10pm from 7 November 2016. 

In August 2018, Whale was suspended by talkRADIO, pending a full investigation, after an interview with author and journalist Nichi Hodgson, who had been sexually assaulted. talkRADIO subsequently described the interview as having been "conducted in a manner that did not reflect the values of the station and completely lacked sensitivity". In a video clip from the interview, Whale was seen laughing when the interviewee described what had happened to her. Whale returned to the air on 13 August.

Personal life
In 1970, Whale married Melinda Maxted. They have two sons, James and Peter. In 1997, Whale's 18-month affair with a listener of his radio show was made public. In February 2018, Whale announced that Maxted had been diagnosed with stage four lung cancer. She died on 12 May 2018. On 13 May 2021, his 70th birthday, Whale announced his engagement on Twitter, but did not reveal his fiancée's identity. In October, Whale married Nadine Talbot-Brown at a ceremony in Tenterden.

In February 2000 Whale was diagnosed with kidney cancer. He had not experienced any symptoms until he noticed blood in his urine, caused by a large tumour on his left kidney. He underwent an operation from which he had a 50% chance of survival, and chose not to have chemotherapy afterwards. In 2006, he launched the James Whale Fund for Kidney Cancer to fund research and raise awareness of the disease. The fund became Kidney Cancer UK in 2016. In August 2020 Whale revealed that his cancer had spread to his spine, brain and lungs.

Whale has often spoken of his dyslexia and is a patron of the National Literacy Association.

Bibliography

References

Sources

External links
 Official website at JamesWhale.co.uk
 Official radio show website at JamesWhaleRadio.co.uk
 
 James Whale on Radio Aire Archive images and audio of James Whale between 1987 and 1989.

1951 births
Living people
English radio personalities
British radio personalities
British radio DJs
English people of Welsh descent
People from Ewell
People from West Malling
Press TV people
Critics of religions
British social commentators